Arnold Schoenberg or Schönberg (13 September 187413 July 1951) was an Austrian-American composer, music theorist, teacher, writer, and painter. He is widely considered one of the most influential composers of the 20th century. He was associated with the expressionist movement in German poetry and art, and leader of the Second Viennese School. As a Jewish composer, Schoenberg was targeted by the Nazi Party, which labeled his works as degenerate music and forbade them from being published. He emigrated to the United States in 1933, becoming an American citizen in 1941.

Schoenberg's approach, bοth in terms of harmony and development, has shaped much of 20th-century musical thought. Many composers from at least three generations have consciously extended his thinking, whereas others have passionately reacted against it.

Schoenberg was known early in his career for simultaneously extending the traditionally opposed German Romantic styles of Brahms and Wagner. Later, his name would come to personify innovations in atonality (although Schoenberg himself detested that term) that would become the most polemical feature of 20th-century classical music. In the 1920s, Schoenberg developed the twelve-tone technique, an influential compositional method of manipulating an ordered series of all twelve notes in the chromatic scale. He also coined the term developing variation and was the first modern composer to embrace ways of developing motifs without resorting to the dominance of a centralized melodic idea.

Schoenberg was also an influential teacher of composition; his students included Alban Berg, Anton Webern, Hanns Eisler, Egon Wellesz, Nikos Skalkottas and later John Cage, Lou Harrison, Earl Kim, Robert Gerhard, Leon Kirchner, Dika Newlin, Oscar Levant, and other prominent musicians. Many of Schoenberg's practices, including the formalization of compositional method and his habit of openly inviting audiences to think analytically, are echoed in avant-garde musical thought throughout the 20th century. His often polemical views of music history and aesthetics were crucial to many significant 20th-century musicologists and critics, including Theodor W. Adorno, Charles Rosen, and Carl Dahlhaus, as well as the pianists Artur Schnabel, Rudolf Serkin, Eduard Steuermann, and Glenn Gould.

Schoenberg's archival legacy is collected at the Arnold Schönberg Center in Vienna.

Biography

Early life

Arnold Schoenberg was born into a lower middle-class Jewish family in the Leopoldstadt district (in earlier times a Jewish ghetto) of Vienna, at "Obere Donaustraße 5". His father Samuel, a native of Szécsény, Hungary, later moved to Pozsony (Pressburg, at that time part of the Kingdom of Hungary, now Bratislava, Slovakia) and then to Vienna, was a shoe-shopkeeper, and his mother Pauline Schoenberg (née Nachod), a native of Prague, was a piano teacher. Arnold was largely self-taught. He took only counterpoint lessons with the composer Alexander Zemlinsky, who was to become his first brother-in-law.

In his twenties, Schoenberg earned a living by orchestrating operettas, while composing his own works, such as the string sextet Verklärte Nacht ("Transfigured Night") (1899). He later made an orchestral version of this, which became one of his most popular pieces. Both Richard Strauss and Gustav Mahler recognized Schoenberg's significance as a composer; Strauss when he encountered Schoenberg's Gurre-Lieder, and Mahler after hearing several of Schoenberg's early works.

Strauss turned to a more conservative idiom in his own work after 1909, and at that point dismissed Schoenberg. Mahler adopted him as a protégé and continued to support him, even after Schoenberg's style reached a point Mahler could no longer understand. Mahler worried about who would look after him after his death. Schoenberg, who had initially despised and mocked Mahler's music, was converted by the "thunderbolt" of Mahler's Third Symphony, which he considered a work of genius. Afterward he "spoke of Mahler as a saint".

In 1898 Schoenberg converted to Christianity in the Lutheran church. According to MacDonald (2008, 93) this was partly to strengthen his attachment to Western European cultural traditions, and partly as a means of self-defence "in a time of resurgent anti-Semitism". In 1933, after long meditation, he returned to Judaism, because he realised that "his racial and religious heritage was inescapable", and to take up an unmistakable position on the side opposing Nazism. He would self-identify as a member of the Jewish religion later in life.

1901–1914: experimenting in atonality

In October 1901, Schoenberg married Mathilde Zemlinsky, the sister of the conductor and composer Alexander von Zemlinsky, with whom Schoenberg had been studying since about 1894. Schoenberg and Mathilde had two children, Gertrud (1902–1947) and Georg (1906–1974). Gertrud would marry Schoenberg's pupil Felix Greissle in 1921.

During the summer of 1908, Schoenberg's wife Mathilde left him for several months for a young Austrian painter, Richard Gerstl (who committed suicide in that November after Mathilde returned to her marriage). This period marked a distinct change in Schoenberg's work. It was during the absence of his wife that he composed "You lean against a silver-willow", the thirteenth song in the cycle Das Buch der Hängenden Gärten, Op. 15, based on the collection of the same name by the German mystical poet Stefan George. This was the first composition without any reference at all to a key.

Also in this year, Schoenberg completed one of his most revolutionary compositions, the String Quartet No. 2. The first two movements, though chromatic in color, use traditional key signatures. The final two movements, again using poetry by George, incorporate a soprano vocal line, breaking with previous string-quartet practice, and daringly weaken the links with traditional tonality. Both movements end on tonic chords, and the work is not fully non-tonal.

During the summer of 1910, Schoenberg wrote his Harmonielehre (Theory of Harmony, Schoenberg 1922), which remains one of the most influential music-theory books. From about 1911, Schoenberg belonged to a circle of artists and intellectuals who included Lene Schneider-Kainer, Franz Werfel, Herwarth Walden, and Else Lasker-Schüler.

In 1910 he met Edward Clark, an English music journalist then working in Germany. Clark became his sole English student, and in his later capacity as a producer for the BBC he was responsible for introducing many of Schoenberg's works, and Schoenberg himself, to Britain (as well as Webern, Berg and others).

Another of his most important works from this atonal or pantonal period is the highly influential Pierrot lunaire, Op. 21, of 1912, a novel cycle of expressionist songs set to a German translation of poems by the Belgian-French poet Albert Giraud. Utilizing the technique of Sprechstimme, or melodramatically spoken recitation, the work pairs a female vocalist with a small ensemble of five musicians. The ensemble, which is now commonly referred to as the Pierrot ensemble, consists of flute (doubling on piccolo), clarinet (doubling on bass clarinet), violin (doubling on viola), violoncello, speaker, and piano.

Wilhelm Bopp, director of the Vienna Conservatory from 1907, wanted a break from the stale environment personified for him by Robert Fuchs and Hermann Graedener. Having considered many candidates, he offered teaching positions to Schoenberg and Franz Schreker in 1912. At the time Schoenberg lived in Berlin. He was not completely cut off from the Vienna Conservatory, having taught a private theory course a year earlier. He seriously considered the offer, but he declined. Writing afterward to Alban Berg, he cited his "aversion to Vienna" as the main reason for his decision, while contemplating that it might have been the wrong one financially, but having made it he felt content. A couple of months later he wrote to Schreker suggesting that it might have been a bad idea for him as well to accept the teaching position.

World War I

World War I brought a crisis in his development. Military service disrupted his life when at the age of 42 he was in the army. He was never able to work uninterrupted or over a period of time, and as a result he left many unfinished works and undeveloped "beginnings". On one occasion, a superior officer demanded to know if he was "this notorious Schoenberg, then"; Schoenberg replied: "Beg to report, sir, yes. Nobody wanted to be, someone had to be, so I let it be me". According to Norman, this is a reference to Schoenberg's apparent "destiny" as the "Emancipator of Dissonance".

In what Alex Ross calls an "act of war psychosis", Schoenberg drew comparisons between Germany's assault on France and his assault on decadent bourgeois artistic values. In August 1914, while denouncing the music of Bizet, Stravinsky, and Ravel, he wrote: "Now comes the reckoning! Now we will throw these mediocre kitschmongers into slavery, and teach them to venerate the German spirit and to worship the German God".

The deteriorating relation between contemporary composers and the public led him to found the Society for Private Musical Performances (Verein für musikalische Privataufführungen in German) in Vienna in 1918. He sought to provide a forum in which modern musical compositions could be carefully prepared and rehearsed, and properly performed under conditions protected from the dictates of fashion and pressures of commerce. From its inception through 1921, when it ended because of economic reasons, the Society presented 353 performances to paying members, sometimes at the rate of one per week. During the first year and a half, Schoenberg did not let any of his own works be performed. Instead, audiences at the Society's concerts heard difficult contemporary compositions by Scriabin, Debussy, Mahler, Webern, Berg, Reger, and other leading figures of early 20th-century music.

Development of the twelve-tone method

Later, Schoenberg was to develop the most influential version of the dodecaphonic (also known as twelve-tone) method of composition, which in French and English was given the alternative name serialism by René Leibowitz and Humphrey Searle in 1947. This technique was taken up by many of his students, who constituted the so-called Second Viennese School. They included Anton Webern, Alban Berg, and Hanns Eisler, all of whom were profoundly influenced by Schoenberg. He published a number of books, ranging from his famous Harmonielehre (Theory of Harmony) to Fundamentals of Musical Composition, many of which are still in print and used by musicians and developing composers.

Schoenberg viewed his development as a natural progression, and he did not deprecate his earlier works when he ventured into serialism. In 1923 he wrote to the Swiss philanthropist Werner Reinhart:

For the present, it matters more to me if people understand my older works ... They are the natural forerunners of my later works, and only those who understand and comprehend these will be able to gain an understanding of the later works that goes beyond a fashionable bare minimum. I do not attach so much importance to being a musical bogey-man as to being a natural continuer of properly-understood good old tradition!

His first wife died in October 1923, and in August of the next year Schoenberg married Gertrud Kolisch (1898–1967), sister of his pupil, the violinist Rudolf Kolisch. They had three children: Nuria Dorothea (born 1932), Ronald Rudolf (born 1937), and Lawrence Adam (born 1941). Gertrude Kolisch Schoenberg wrote the libretto for Schoenberg's one-act opera Von heute auf morgen under the pseudonym Max Blonda. At her request Schoenberg's (ultimately unfinished) piece, Die Jakobsleiter was prepared for performance by Schoenberg's student Winfried Zillig. After her husband's death in 1951 she founded Belmont Music Publishers devoted to the publication of his works. Arnold used the notes G and E (German: Es, i.e., "S") for "Gertrud Schoenberg", in the Suite, for septet, Op. 29 (1925). (see musical cryptogram).

Following the death in 1924 of composer Ferruccio Busoni, who had served as Director of a Master Class in Composition at the Prussian Academy of Arts in Berlin, Schoenberg was appointed to this post the next year, but because of health problems was unable to take up his post until 1926. Among his notable students during this period were the composers Robert Gerhard, Nikos Skalkottas, and Josef Rufer.

Along with his twelve-tone works, 1930 marks Schoenberg's return to tonality, with numbers 4 and 6 of the Six Pieces for Male Chorus Op. 35, the other pieces being dodecaphonic.

Third Reich and move to the United States
Schoenberg continued in his post until the Nazi regime Machtergreifung came to power in 1933. While on vacation in France, he was warned that returning to Germany would be dangerous. Schoenberg formally reclaimed membership in the Jewish religion at a Paris synagogue, then traveled with his family to the United States. This happened after his attempts to move to Britain came to nothing.

His first teaching position in the United States was at the Malkin Conservatory (Boston University). He moved to Los Angeles, where he taught at the University of Southern California and the University of California, Los Angeles, both of which later named a music building on their respective campuses Schoenberg Hall. He was appointed visiting professor at UCLA in 1935 on the recommendation of Otto Klemperer, music director and conductor of the Los Angeles Philharmonic Orchestra; and the next year was promoted to professor at a salary of $5,100 per year, which enabled him in either May 1936 or 1937 to buy a Spanish Revival house at 116 North Rockingham in Brentwood Park, near the UCLA campus, for $18,000. This address was directly across the street from Shirley Temple's house, and there he befriended fellow composer (and tennis partner) George Gershwin. The Schoenbergs were able to employ domestic help and began holding Sunday afternoon gatherings that were known for excellent coffee and Viennese pastries. Frequent guests included Otto Klemperer (who studied composition privately with Schoenberg beginning in April 1936), Edgard Varèse, Joseph Achron, Louis Gruenberg, Ernst Toch, and, on occasion, well-known actors such as Harpo Marx and Peter Lorre. Composers Leonard Rosenman and George Tremblay and the Hollywood orchestrator Edward B. Powell studied with Schoenberg at this time.

After his move to the United States, where he arrived on 31 October 1933, the composer used the alternative spelling of his surname Schoenberg, rather than Schönberg, in what he called "deference to American practice", though according to one writer he first made the change a year earlier.

He lived there the rest of his life, but at first he was not settled. In around 1934, he applied for a position of teacher of harmony and theory at the New South Wales State Conservatorium in Sydney. The Director, Edgar Bainton, rejected him for being Jewish and for having "modernist ideas and dangerous tendencies." Schoenberg also at one time explored the idea of emigrating to New Zealand. His secretary and student (and nephew of Schoenberg's mother-in-law Henriette Kolisch), was Richard Hoffmann, Viennese-born but who lived in New Zealand in 1935–1947, and Schoenberg had since childhood been fascinated with islands, and with New Zealand in particular, possibly because of the beauty of the postage stamps issued by that country.

During this final period, he composed several notable works, including the difficult Violin Concerto, Op. 36 (1934/36), the Kol Nidre, Op. 39, for chorus and orchestra (1938), the Ode to Napoleon Buonaparte, Op. 41 (1942), the haunting Piano Concerto, Op. 42 (1942), and his memorial to the victims of the Holocaust, A Survivor from Warsaw, Op. 46 (1947). He was unable to complete his opera Moses und Aron (1932/33), which was one of the first works of its genre written completely using dodecaphonic composition. Along with twelve-tone music, Schoenberg also returned to tonality with works during his last period, like the Suite for Strings in G major (1935), the Chamber Symphony No. 2 in E minor, Op. 38 (begun in 1906, completed in 1939), the Variations on a Recitative in D minor, Op. 40 (1941). During this period his notable students included John Cage and Lou Harrison.

In 1941, he became a citizen of the United States. Here he was the first composer in residence at the Music Academy of the West summer conservatory.

Superstition and death 

Schoenberg's superstitious nature may have triggered his death. The composer had triskaidekaphobia, and according to friend Katia Mann, he feared he would die during a year that was a multiple of 13. This possibly began in 1908 with the composition of the thirteenth song of the song cycle Das Buch der Hängenden Gärten Op. 15. He dreaded his sixty-fifth birthday in 1939 so much that a friend asked the composer and astrologer Dane Rudhyar to prepare Schoenberg's horoscope. Rudhyar did this and told Schoenberg that the year was dangerous, but not fatal.

But in 1950, on his 76th birthday, an astrologer wrote Schoenberg a note warning him that the year was a critical one: 7 + 6 = 13. This stunned and depressed the composer, for up to that point he had only been wary of multiples of 13 and never considered adding the digits of his age. He died on Friday, 13 July 1951, shortly before midnight. Schoenberg had stayed in bed all day, sick, anxious, and depressed. His wife Gertrud reported in a telegram to her sister-in-law Ottilie the next day that Arnold died at 11:45 pm, 15 minutes before midnight. In a letter to Ottilie dated 4 August 1951, Gertrud explained, "About a quarter to twelve I looked at the clock and said to myself: another quarter of an hour and then the worst is over. Then the doctor called me. Arnold's throat rattled twice, his heart gave a powerful beat and that was the end".

Schoenberg's ashes were later interred at the Zentralfriedhof in Vienna on 6 June 1974.

Music

Schoenberg's significant compositions in the repertory of modern art music extend over a period of more than 50 years. Traditionally they are divided into three periods though this division is arguably arbitrary as the music in each of these periods is considerably varied. The idea that his twelve-tone period "represents a stylistically unified body of works is simply not supported by the musical evidence", and important musical characteristics—especially those related to motivic development—transcend these boundaries completely. 

The first of these periods, 1894–1907, is identified in the legacy of the high-Romantic composers of the late nineteenth century, as well as with "expressionist" movements in poetry and art. The second, 1908–1922, is typified by the abandonment of key centers, a move often described (though not by Schoenberg) as "free atonality". The third, from 1923 onward, commences with Schoenberg's invention of dodecaphonic, or "twelve-tone" compositional method. Schoenberg's best-known students, Hanns Eisler, Alban Berg, and Anton Webern, followed Schoenberg faithfully through each of these intellectual and aesthetic transitions, though not without considerable experimentation and variety of approach.

First period: Late Romanticism
Beginning with songs and string quartets written around the turn of the century, Schoenberg's concerns as a composer positioned him uniquely among his peers, in that his procedures exhibited characteristics of both Brahms and Wagner, who for most contemporary listeners, were considered polar opposites, representing mutually exclusive directions in the legacy of German music. Schoenberg's Six Songs, Op. 3 (1899–1903), for example, exhibit a conservative clarity of tonal organization typical of Brahms and Mahler, reflecting an interest in balanced phrases and an undisturbed hierarchy of key relationships. However, the songs also explore unusually bold incidental chromaticism and seem to aspire to a Wagnerian "representational" approach to motivic identity. 

The synthesis of these approaches reaches an apex in his Verklärte Nacht, Op. 4 (1899), a programmatic work for string sextet that develops several distinctive "leitmotif"-like themes, each one eclipsing and subordinating the last. The only motivic elements that persist throughout the work are those that are perpetually dissolved, varied, and re-combined, in a technique, identified primarily in Brahms's music, that Schoenberg called "developing variation". Schoenberg's procedures in the work are organized in two ways simultaneously; at once suggesting a Wagnerian narrative of motivic ideas, as well as a Brahmsian approach to motivic development and tonal cohesion.

Second period: Free atonality
Schoenberg's music from 1908 onward experiments in a variety of ways with the absence of traditional keys or tonal centers. His first explicitly atonal piece was the second string quartet, Op. 10, with soprano. The last movement of this piece has no key signature, marking Schoenberg's formal divorce from diatonic harmonies. Other important works of the era include his song cycle Das Buch der Hängenden Gärten, Op. 15 (1908–1909), his Five Orchestral Pieces, Op. 16 (1909), the influential Pierrot Lunaire, Op. 21 (1912), as well as his dramatic Erwartung, Op. 17 (1909). 

The urgency of musical constructions lacking in tonal centers, or traditional dissonance-consonance relationships, however, can be traced as far back as his Chamber Symphony No. 1, Op. 9 (1906), a work remarkable for its tonal development of whole-tone and quartal harmony, and its initiation of dynamic and unusual ensemble relationships, involving dramatic interruption and unpredictable instrumental allegiances; many of these features would typify the timbre-oriented chamber music aesthetic of the coming century.

Third period: Twelve-tone and tonal works
In the early 1920s, he worked at evolving a means of order that would make his musical texture simpler and clearer. This resulted in the "method of composing with twelve tones which are related only with one another", in which the twelve pitches of the octave (unrealized compositionally) are regarded as equal, and no one note or tonality is given the emphasis it occupied in classical harmony. He regarded it as the equivalent in music of Albert Einstein's discoveries in physics. Schoenberg announced it characteristically, during a walk with his friend Josef Rufer, when he said, "I have made a discovery which will ensure the supremacy of German music for the next hundred years". This period included the Variations for Orchestra, Op. 31 (1928); Piano Pieces, Opp. 33a & b (1931), and the Piano Concerto, Op. 42 (1942). Contrary to his reputation for strictness, Schoenberg's use of the technique varied widely according to the demands of each individual composition. Thus the structure of his unfinished opera Moses und Aron is unlike that of his Phantasy for Violin and Piano, Op. 47 (1949).

Ten features of Schoenberg's mature twelve-tone practice are characteristic, interdependent, and interactive:
 Hexachordal inversional combinatoriality
 Aggregates
 Linear set presentation
 Partitioning
 Isomorphic partitioning
 Invariants
 Hexachordal levels
 Harmony, "consistent with and derived from the properties of the referential set"
 Metre, established through "pitch-relational characteristics"
 Multidimensional set presentations

Reception and legacy

First works
After some early difficulties, Schoenberg began to win public acceptance with works such as the tone poem Pelleas und Melisande at a Berlin performance in 1907. At the Vienna première of the Gurre-Lieder in 1913, he received an ovation that lasted a quarter of an hour and culminated with Schoenberg's being presented with a laurel crown.

Nonetheless, much of his work was not well received. His Chamber Symphony No. 1 premièred unremarkably in 1907. However, when it was played again in the Skandalkonzert on 31 March 1913, (which also included works by Berg, Webern and Zemlinsky), "one could hear the shrill sound of door keys among the violent clapping, and in the second gallery the first fight of the evening began." Later in the concert, during a performance of the Altenberg Lieder by Berg, fighting broke out after Schoenberg interrupted the performance to threaten removal by the police of any troublemakers.

Twelve-tone period
According to Ethan Haimo, understanding of Schoenberg's twelve-tone work has been difficult to achieve owing in part to the "truly revolutionary nature" of his new system, misinformation disseminated by some early writers about the system's "rules" and "exceptions" that bear "little relation to the most significant features of Schoenberg's music", the composer's secretiveness, and the widespread unavailability of his sketches and manuscripts until the late 1970s. During his life, he was "subjected to a range of criticism and abuse that is shocking even in hindsight".

Schoenberg criticized Igor Stravinsky's new neoclassical trend in the poem "Der neue Klassizismus" (in which he derogates Neoclassicism, and obliquely refers to Stravinsky as "Der kleine Modernsky"), which he used as text for the third of his Drei Satiren, Op. 28.

Schoenberg's serial technique of composition with twelve notes became one of the most central and polemical issues among American and European musicians during the mid- to late-twentieth century. Beginning in the 1940s and continuing to the present day, composers such as Pierre Boulez, Karlheinz Stockhausen, Luigi Nono and Milton Babbitt have extended Schoenberg's legacy in increasingly radical directions. The major cities of the United States (e.g., Los Angeles, New York, and Boston) have had historically significant performances of Schoenberg's music, with advocates such as Babbitt in New York and the Franco-American conductor-pianist Jacques-Louis Monod. Schoenberg's students have been influential teachers at major American universities: Leonard Stein at USC, UCLA and CalArts; Richard Hoffmann at Oberlin; Patricia Carpenter at Columbia; and Leon Kirchner and Earl Kim at Harvard. Musicians associated with Schoenberg have had a profound influence upon contemporary music performance practice in the US (e.g., Louis Krasner, Eugene Lehner and Rudolf Kolisch at the New England Conservatory of Music; Eduard Steuermann and Felix Galimir at the Juilliard School). In Europe, the work of Hans Keller, and René Leibowitz has had a measurable influence in spreading Schoenberg's musical legacy outside of Germany and Austria. His pupil and assistant Max Deutsch, who later became a professor of music, was also a conductor. who made a recording of three "master works" Schoenberg with the Orchestre de la Suisse Romande, released posthumously in late 2013. This recording includes short lectures by Deutsch on each of the pieces.

Criticism
In the 1920s, Ernst Krenek criticized a certain unnamed brand of contemporary music (presumably Schoenberg and his disciples) as "the self-gratification of an individual who sits in his studio and invents rules according to which he then writes down his notes". Schoenberg took offense at this remark and answered that Krenek "wishes for only whores as listeners".

Allen Shawn has noted that, given Schoenberg's living circumstances, his work is usually defended rather than listened to, and that it is difficult to experience it apart from the ideology that surrounds it. Richard Taruskin asserted that Schoenberg committed what he terms a "poietic fallacy", the conviction that what matters most (or all that matters) in a work of art is the making of it, the maker's input, and that the listener's pleasure must not be the composer's primary objective. Taruskin also criticizes the ideas of measuring Schoenberg's value as a composer in terms of his influence on other artists, the overrating of technical innovation, and the restriction of criticism to matters of structure and craft while derogating other approaches as vulgarian.

Relationship with the general public

Writing in 1977, Christopher Small observed, "Many music lovers, even today, find difficulty with Schoenberg's music". Small wrote his short biography a quarter of a century after the composer's death. According to Nicholas Cook, writing some twenty years after Small, Schoenberg had thought that this lack of comprehension

Ben Earle (2003) found that Schoenberg, while revered by experts and taught to "generations of students" on degree courses, remained unloved by the public. Despite more than forty years of advocacy and the production of "books devoted to the explanation of this difficult repertory to non-specialist audiences", it would seem that in particular, "British attempts to popularize music of this kind  ... can now safely be said to have failed".

In his 2018 biography of Schoenberg's near contemporary and similarly pioneering composer, Debussy, Stephen Walsh takes issue with the idea that it is not possible "for a creative artist to be both radical and popular". Walsh concludes, "Schoenberg may be the first 'great' composer in modern history whose music has not entered the repertoire almost a century and a half after his birth".

Thomas Mann's novel Doctor Faustus
Adrian Leverkühn, the protagonist of Thomas Mann's novel Doctor Faustus (1947), is a composer whose use of twelve-tone technique parallels the innovations of Arnold Schoenberg. Schoenberg was unhappy about this and initiated an exchange of letters with Mann following the novel's publication.

Leverkühn, who may be based on Nietzsche, sells his soul to the Devil. Writer Sean O'Brien comments that "written in the shadow of Hitler, Doktor Faustus observes the rise of Nazism, but its relationship to political history is oblique".

Personality and extramusical interests

Schoenberg was a painter of considerable ability, whose works were considered good enough to exhibit alongside those of Franz Marc and Wassily Kandinsky. as fellow members of the expressionist group Der Blaue Reiter.

He was interested in Hopalong Cassidy films, which Paul Buhle and David Wagner (2002, v–vii) attribute to the films' left-wing screenwriters—a rather odd claim in light of Schoenberg's statement that he was a "bourgeois" turned monarchist.

Textbooks 
 1922. Harmonielehre, third edition. Vienna: Universal Edition. (Originally published 1911).
 1943. Models for Beginners in Composition, New York: G. Schirmer, Inc.
 1954. Structural Functions of Harmony. New York: W. W. Norton; London: Williams and Norgate. Revised edition, New York, London: W. W. Norton and Company 1969. 
 1964. Preliminary Exercises in Counterpoint, edited with a foreword by Leonard Stein. New York, St. Martin's Press. Reprinted, Los Angeles: Belmont Music Publishers 2003.
 1967. Fundamentals of Musical Composition, edited by Gerald Strang, with an introduction by Leonard Stein. New York: St. Martin's Press. Reprinted 1985, London: Faber and Faber. 
 1978. Theory of Harmony, English edition, translated by Roy E. Carter, based on Harmonielehre 1922. Berkeley, Los Angeles: University of California Press. 
 1979. Die Grundlagen der musikalischen Komposition, translated into German by Rudolf Kolisch; edited by Rudolf Stephan. Vienna: Universal Edition (German translation of Fundamentals of Musical Composition).
 2003. Preliminary Exercises in Counterpoint, Reprinted, Los Angeles: Belmont Music Publishers.
 2010. Theory of Harmony, 100th Anniversary Edition. Berkeley: California University Press. 2nd edition. 
 2016. Models for Beginners in Composition, Reprinted, London: Oxford University Press.

Writings 
 1947. "The Musician". In The Works of the Mind, edited by Robert B. Heywood,  Chicago: University of Chicago Press. 
 1950. Style and Idea: Selected Writings of Arnold Schoenberg, edited and translated by Dika Newlin. New York: Philosophical Library.
 1958. Ausgewählte Briefe, by B. Schott's Söhne, Mainz.
 1964. Arnold Schoenberg Letters, selected and edited by Erwin Stein, translated from the original German by Eithne Wilkins and Ernst Kaiser. London: Faber and Faber Ltd.
 1965. Arnold Schoenberg Letters, selected and edited by Erwin Stein, translated from the original German by Eithne Wilkins and Ernst Kaiser. New York: St.Martin's Press.
 1975. Style and Idea: Selected Writings of Arnold Schoenberg, edited by Leonard Stein, with translations by Leo Black. New York: St. Martins Press; London: Faber & Faber.  Expanded from the 1950 Philosophical Library (New York) publication edited by Dika Newlin (559 pages from 231). The volume carries the note "Several of the essays ... were originally written in German (translated by Dika Newlin)" in both editions.
 1984. Style and Idea: Selected Writings, translated by Leo Black. Berkeley: California University Press.
 1984. Arnold Schoenberg Wassily Kandinsky: Letters, Pictures and Documents, edited by Jelena Hahl-Koch, translated by John C. Crawford. London: Faber and Faber. , 
 1987. Arnold Schoenberg Letters, selected and edited by Erwin Stein, translated from the original German by Eithne Wilkins and Ernst Kaiser. Berkeley and Los Angeles: University of California Press. 
 2006. The Musical Idea and the Logic, Technique, and Art of Its Presentation, new paperback English edition. Bloomington and London: Indiana University Press. 
 2010. Style and Idea: Selected Writings, 60th anniversary (second) edition, translated by Leonard Stein and Leo Black. Berkeley: California University Press. 
 2020. Kathryn Puffet and Barbara Schingnitz: Three Men of Letters. Arnold Schönberg, Alban Berg and Anton Webern, 1906-1921. Vienna: Hollitzer, 2020.

See also 
 Arnold Schönberg Complete Edition
 Arnold Schönberg Prize
List of refugees

References

Notes

Citations

Sources

 
 
 
 
 
 
 
 
 
 
 
 
 
 
 
 
 
 
 
 
 
 
 

 
 
 
 
  
 
 
 
 
 
 
 
 
 
 
 
 
 
  (Reissued in The Danger of Music and Other Anti-Utopian Essays. Berkeley and Los Angeles: University of California Press, 2007, pp. 301–329. ).

Further reading

 Adorno, Theodor. 1967. Prisms, translated from the German by Samuel and Shierry Weber London: Spearman; Cambridge, Massachusetts: MIT Press.
 Anon. 2002. "Arnold Schönberg and His God". Vienna: Arnold Schönberg Center (accessed 1 December 2008).
 Anon. 1997–2013. "'Degenerate' Music". In A Teacher's Guide to the Holocaust. The Florida Center for Instructional Technology, College of Education, University of South Florida (accessed 16 June 2014).
 Auner, Joseph. 1993. A Schoenberg Reader. New Haven: Yale University Press. 
 
 Berry, Mark. 2019. Arnold Schoenberg. London: Reaktion Books.
 Boulez, Pierre. 1991. "Schoenberg is Dead" (1952). In his Stocktakings from an Apprenticeship, collected and presented by Paule Thévenin, translated by Stephen Walsh, with an introduction by Robert Piencikowski, 209–14. Oxford: Clarendon Press; New York: Oxford University Press. 
 Brand, Julianne, Christopher Hailey, and Donald Harris (editors). 1987. The Berg-Schoenberg Correspondence: Selected Letters. New York, London: W. W. Norton and Company. 
 Buhle, Paul, and David Wagner. 2002. Radical Hollywood: The Untold Story Behind America's Favorite Movies. New York: The New Press. 
 Clausen, Detlev. 2008. Theodor W. Adorno: One Last Genius, translated by Rodney Livingstone. Cambridge: Harvard University Press. 
 Byron, Avior. 2006. "The Test Pressings of Schoenberg Conducting Pierrot lunaire: Sprechstimme Reconsidered". Music Theory Online 12, no. 1 (February).
 Cohen, Mitchell, "A Dissonant Schoenberg in Berlin and Paris," "Jewish Review of Books," April 2016.
 da Costa Meyer, Esther. 2003. "Schoenberg's Echo: The Composer as Painter". In Schoenberg, Kandinsky, and the Blue Rider, edited by Fred Wasserman and Esther da Costa Meyer, foreword by Joan Rosenbaum, preface by Christian Meyer. London and New York: Scala. 
 Everdell, William R. 1998 The First Moderns: Profiles in the Origins of Twentieth-Century Thought. Chicago: University of Chicago Press.
 Eybl, Martin. 2004. Die Befreiung des Augenblicks: Schönbergs Skandalkonzerte von 1907 und 1908: eine Dokumentation. Wiener Veröffentlichungen zur Musikgeschichte 4. Vienna, Cologne, Weimar: Böhlau. 
 Floirat, Bernard. 2001. Les Fonctions structurelles de l'harmonie d'Arnold Schoenberg. Eska, Musurgia. 
 Frisch, Walter (ed.). 1999. Schoenberg and His World. Bard Music Festival Series. Princeton: Princeton University Press.  (cloth);  (pbk).
 Genette, Gérard. 1997. Immanence and Transcendence, translated by G. M. Goshgarian. Ithaca: Cornell University Press. 
 Gur, Golan. 2009. "Arnold Schoenberg and the Ideology of Progress in Twentieth-Century Musical Thinking". Search: Journal for New Music and Culture 5 (Summer). Online journal (Accessed 17 October 2011).
 Greissle-Schönberg, Arnold, and Nancy Bogen. [n.d.] Arnold Schönberg's European Family (e-book). The Lark Ascending, Inc. (accessed 2 May 2010)
 Hyde, Martha M. 1982. Schoenberg's Twelve-Tone Harmony: The Suite Op. 29 and the Compositional Sketches. Studies in Musicology, series edited by George Buelow. Ann Arbor: UMI Research Press. 
 Kandinsky, Wassily. 2000. "Arnold Schönberg als Maler/Arnold Schönberg as Painter". Journal of the Arnold Schönberg Center, no. 1:131–76.
 Mahler, Alma. 1960. Mein Leben, with a foreword by Willy Haas. Frankfurt am Main: S. Fischer, My Life, My Loves: The Memoirs of Alma Mahler, St. Martin's Griffin (1958) Paperback 
 
 Orenstein, Arbie. 1975. Ravel: Man and Musician. London: Columbia University Press.
 
 Petropoulos, Jonathan. 2014. Artists Under Hitler. New Haven and London: Yale University Press. 
 Ringer, Alexander. 1990. "Arnold Schoenberg: The Composer as Jew". Oxford: Clarendon Press; New York: Oxford University Press. 
 Rollet, Philippe (ed.). 2010. Arnold Schönberg: Visions et regards, with a preface by Frédéric Chambert and Alain Mousseigne. Montreuil-sous-Bois: Liénart. 
 Schoenberg, Arnold. 1922. Harmonielehre, third edition. Vienna: Universal Edition. (Originally published 1911). Translation by Roy E. Carter, based on the third edition, as Theory of Harmony. Berkeley, Los Angeles: University of California Press, 1978. 
 Schoenberg, Arnold. 1959. Structural Functions of Harmony. Translated by Leonard Stein. London: Williams and Norgate; Revised edition, New York, London: W. W. Norton 1969. 
 Shawn, Allen. 2002. Arnold Schoenberg's Journey. New York: Farrar Straus and Giroux. 
 Stegemann, Benedikt. 2013. Theory of Tonality: Theoretical Studies. Wilhelmshaven: Noetzel. 
 Weiss, Adolph. 1932. "The Lyceum of Schonberg", Modern Music 9, no. 3 (March–April): 99–107.
 Wright, James K. 2007. Schoenberg, Wittgenstein, and the Vienna Circle. Bern: Verlag Peter Lang. 
 Wright, James and Alan Gillmor (eds.). 2009. Schoenberg's Chamber Music, Schoenberg's World. New York: Pendragon Press.

External links

 
 
 Arnold Schoenberg Center in Vienna
 Archival records: Arnold Schoenberg collection, 1900–1951, Library of Congress
 Schönberg. Linking two continents in sound. a web-based exhibition of Arnold Schönberg curated by Österreichische Mediathek in cooperation with the Arnold Schönberg Center
 Recordings at Internet Archive
 Arnold Schoenberg (1874-1951) videos compiled by Randol Schoenberg on YouTube

 
1874 births
1951 deaths
20th-century American composers
20th-century Austrian composers
20th-century Austrian male musicians
20th-century Austrian painters
20th-century male artists
20th-century classical composers
20th-century American male musicians
American classical composers
American former Christians
American male classical composers
American music theorists
American opera composers
20th-century American painters
Austrian Christians
Austrian classical composers
Austrian emigrants to Germany
Austrian Jews
Austrian male classical composers
Austrian male painters
Austrian monarchists
Austrian music arrangers
Austrian music theorists
Austrian opera composers
Austrian refugees
Austro-Hungarian military personnel of World War I
Baalei teshuva
Ballet composers
Berlin University of the Arts alumni
Burials at the Vienna Central Cemetery
Composers for piano
Composers for pipe organ
Composers for violin
Composers from Vienna
Converts to Judaism from Christianity
Expressionist music
Jewish American classical composers
Jewish classical composers
Jewish emigrants from Nazi Germany to the United States
Jewish painters
Jewish opera composers
Male opera composers
Music Academy of the West faculty
People from Brentwood, Los Angeles
People from Leopoldstadt
Academic staff of the Prussian Academy of Arts
Pupils of Alexander Zemlinsky
Second Viennese School
Twelve-tone and serial composers